Bolton is a town in the Metropolitan Borough of Bolton, Greater Manchester, England, and its central area is unparished. The central area of the town contains over 230 listed buildings that are recorded in the National Heritage List for England. Of these, three are listed at Grade I, the highest of the three grades, 13 are at Grade II*, the middle grade, and the others are at Grade II, the lowest grade.

Most of the listed buildings come from the period of the Industrial Revolution and later. Before this, the surviving buildings include two halls, Smithills Hall and Hall i' th' Wood, a church, St Mary the Virgin's Church, Deane, farmhouses, farm buildings, houses and cottages. The major industry in the town was fine cotton spinning. At one time there were about 160 cotton mills, of which only a few survive, they are listed, and are now used for other purposes. The majority of the listed buildings are houses, mainly those provided for workers in the mills and other industries, including engineering. The other listed buildings include larger houses and associated structures, churches and items in the churchyards, bridges, shops, civic buildings, hotels and public houses, schools, railway viaducts, banks, statues, memorials, and two groups of telephone kiosks.


Key

Buildings

References

Citations

Sources

Lists of listed buildings in Greater Manchester